The Heaven Sword and Dragon Saber is a television series adapted from Louis Cha's novel of the same title. The series was first broadcast in Taiwan on CTS from December 2002 to February 2003.

Cast
 Alec Su as Zhang Wuji; Zhang Cuishan
 Ashton Chen as young Zhang Wuji
 Alyssa Chia as Zhao Min
 Gao Yuanyuan as Zhou Zhiruo
 Florence Tan as Xiaozhao
 Chen Zihan as Yin Li (Zhu'er)
 Yu Wenzhong as Zhang Sanfeng
 Zhang Tielin as Yang Xiao
 Bao Yilin as Yang Buhui
 Zhang Yijing as young Yang Buhui
 Phyllis Quek as Yin Susu
 Elvis Tsui as Xie Xun
 Zhang Guoli as Cheng Kun
 Wang Gang as Seventh Prince
 Tao Hong as Ji Xiaofu
 Yan Minqiu as Miejue
 Yan Qingyu as Daiqisi (Golden Flower Granny)
 Wang Gang as Song Yuanqiao
 Liu Hengyu as Song Qingshu
 Li Jinrong as Yu Lianzhou
 Liu Quan as Yu Daiyan
 Li Shengyu as Zhang Songxi
 Han Fuyi as Yin Liting
 Ma Qiang as Mo Shenggu
 Ji Qilin as Yin Tianzheng
 Liu Chunxiang as Yin Yewang
 Liu Changsheng as Wei Yixiao
 Li Lianyi as Zhou Dian
 Ma Zhaogang as Shuobude
 Xie Jiaqi as Leng Qian
 Fu Heng as Chang Yuchun
 Yuan Yuan as Fan Yao
 Deli Ge'er as Ruyang Prince
 Yang Guang as Wang Baobao
 Sun Bin as Chen Youliang
 Lin Jinfeng as Zhu Yuanzhang
 Du Yuming as Lu Zhangke
 Jin Song as He Biweng
 Shen Baoping as He Taichong
 Li Qingxiang as Zhu Changling
 Zhan Xiaonan as Zhu Jiuzhen
 Liu Wen as Wu Qingying
 Hao Aiming as Wei Bi
 Lin Jing as Ding Minjun
 Liang Tian as Hu Qingniu
 Dong Xiaoyan as Wang Nangu
 Hu Xiaoran as Yellow Dress Maiden (Lady Yang)

External links
  The Heaven Sword and Dragon Saber on Sina.com
 

2003 Chinese television series debuts
2003 Chinese television series endings
2003 Taiwanese television series debuts
2003 Taiwanese television series endings
2003 Singaporean television series debuts
2003 Singaporean television series endings
Television shows based on The Heaven Sword and Dragon Saber
Television series set in the Yuan dynasty
Singaporean wuxia television series
Chinese wuxia television series
Taiwanese wuxia television series
Television series about orphans
Television shows set on islands
Television shows about rebels
Mandarin-language television shows
Chinese Television System original programming